The K-Love Fan Awards (stylized as K-LOVE Fan Awards) is an annual American Christian music fan-voted awards ceremony show that is produced by K-Love. The show honors the most popular names in Christian music, sports, books and movies. The K-Love Fan Awards have been annually since 2013.

History
On February 13, 2013, K-Love held a press conference at the Ryman Auditorium Nashville, Tennessee, where they announced the inaugural K-Love Fan Awards, being the first fan-voted awards show for Christian music history, with artists such as TobyMac, Jeremy Camp, Francesca Battistelli in attendance. The voting process was set to begin in May, with the awards show where the winners would be announced set to be held on June 1, 2013, at the Ryman Auditorium and with hosting being done by Phil, Kay, Jase, and Missy Robertson of Duck Dynasty fame. K-Love had chosen Nashville as the host city for the award show because it is "home to the faith-based entertainment industry." On May 1, 2013, K-Love announced the nominees and performers for the awards ceremony, indicating that the nominees had been selected on the basis of airplay, spins, impact and overall performance. The awards ceremony was successfully held, drawing to a close on June 2, 2013.

In January 2016, K-Love opened official nominee selection to the fans for the first time, by way of online voting, in the lead-up to the 2016 K-Love Fan Awards. In February 2016, The K-Love Fan Awards were nominated by the Midsouth Emmy Awards in the Special Event Coverage, Lighting, and Set Design at the 30th Midsouth Emmy Awards. The K-Love Fan Awards won the Midsouth Emmy Awards for Lighting and Set Design.

In April 2018, K-Love announced that they had entered into a new partnership with TBN to televise the awards, beginning with the 2018 awards ceremony which was set to be broadcast by the network on May 31, 2018.

In April 2020, K-Love postponed the 2020 K-Love Fan Awards in abiding with social distancing regulations introduced in fighting the COVID-19 pandemic, announced that the awards weekend would return May 28 through 30, 2021.

Categories

Current categories
 Artist of the Year
 Male Artist of the Year
 Female Artist of the Year
 Group/Duo of the Year
 Song of the Year
 Worship Song of the Year
 Breakout Single
 Film & Television Impact
 Book Impact
 Podcast of the Year
 Sports Impact

Retired categories
 Best Live Show

References

External links
 

 
Culture of Nashville, Tennessee
Awards established in 2013
American music awards
2013 establishments in Tennessee